The 2010 Asia Cup (also known as Micromax Asia Cup) was the tenth edition of the Asia Cup cricket tournament, which was held in Sri Lanka from 15–24 June 2010. Only the test playing nations India, Pakistan, Sri Lanka and Bangladesh were taking part in the competition. India defeated Sri Lanka by 81 runs in the final to win a record 5th Asia Cup title.

The final match was played on 24 June 2010 at the Rangiri Dambulla International Stadium, Dambulla, which was played between India and Sri Lanka to determine the winner of the 2010 season of the Asia Cup.

Winning the toss, India elected to bat. India set up a total of 268/6 off 50 overs for their opposition. Sri Lanka chased the total unsuccessfully.

Match Details and Officials 
 On-field umpires:  Billy Bowden    Billy Doctrove
  TV Umpire:  Ahsan Raza
 Reserve umpire:  SH Sarathkumara
 Match referee:  Andy Pycroft
 Toss: India elected to bat first
 Result: India won by 81 runs
 League impact: India won the 2010 Asia Cup

Background

Final Match

India innings 
The final of the 2010 Asia Cup was played on 24 June 2010 in Dambulla between India and Sri Lanka. Indian captain MS Dhoni won the toss and elected to bat first. Gautam Gambhir and Dinesh Karthik gave India a promising start but Gambhir was soon dismissed at 30 with India rollicking at 38/1 off 6.1 overs. Then Virat Kohli and Karthik put up a partnership of 62 runs after which Kohli was caught by Kumar Sangakkara behind the wickets. The highest scorer for the Indian team was Karthik (66 off 84) followed by Rohit Sharma (41) and MS Dhoni (38). India managed to score 268/6 in their 50 overs with Sri Lanka needing 269 runs to win the championship.

Sri Lanka innings 
The Sri Lankan batting started off to a slow start with Tillakaratne Dilshan caught in the first over. First five wickets fell off in quick succession within the score of 50 runs. Upul Tharanga, Mahela Jayawardene, Angelo Mathews and Kumar Sangakkara followed Dilshan soon after. After this, a promising partnership developed between Thilina Kandamby and Chamara Kapugedera (55 runs) which seemed to bring back Sri Lankan hopes in the match. But after the fall of this partnership, Sri Lanka never managed to recover and were all out for a score of 187 in 44.4 overs. India won the match by 81 runs, and with it, the Asia Cup after 15 years.

Summary 
Thilina Kandamby (2/37 in 7 overs) was the best in the bowling department for Sri Lanka, followed by Lasith Malinga who also took 2 wickets giving 57 runs in 10 overs.

The Indian bowling attack was spearheaded by Ashish Nehra who took 4 wickets in 9 overs, followed by Ravindra Jadeja (2 wickets), Praveen Kumar (2 wickets) and Zaheer Khan (2 wickets).

Dinesh Karthik was declared the Man of the Match for his match winning innings of 66 off 84 balls while Pakistan's Shahid Afridi was declared Man of the Series for scoring 265 runs in 3 matches during the tournament

Scorecard

India innings

Sri Lanka innings 

Source : Scorecard on ESPNcricinfo

References 

Asia Cup Final
Asia Cup Final